Rabi Yosip Bet Yosip (Assyrian: ܝܵܘܣܸܦ ܒܹܝܬܼ ܝܵܘܣܸܦ ) is an Assyrian poet. He was born in 1942 in the village of Zoomalan in Urmia, Iran. He is known for writing the Assyrian national anthem, Roomrama.

Organizations 
He joined several Assyrian organizations:
 Shooshata Umtanaia (The Society of Assyrian National Progress - Assyrian Youth Organization)
He assisted Shooshata Umtanaia in assembling the first and largest library of Assyrian books ever collected in modern Assyrian history.
 Nineveh Choir (1960, Tehran)
Nineveh Choir was conducted by maestro Nebu Issabey in Tehran.
 Sita Sapreyta (Assyrian Youth Cultural Society)

Composed Poems 
 Mawd'anuta
 Sluta D-Atouraya D-Idyum
 Sluta D-Burakha
 Atwatè Rushma D-Lishana
 Maqruta L-'ohdana D-Yimmi
 Bèt Nisanè
 Ganta D-Alaha
 Dam‘ita D-Ishtar
 Tèra D-Madinkha
 Martyanuta D-Ninwè Yimma
 Ba‘uta D-Yimma
 Ba‘uta D-Ninwayè
 Qala D-Umta
 Talga D-Turanè D-Hakkarè
 Quyama Dikhya
 Wardè D-Kitwè
 Ktuta Nqirta L-Qayè
 Brata D-Sahda Gu Ma‘irwa
 Bèblè D-Go Lèlawatè
 Ani D-Ki Khayyi ‘am Alaha
 Mhadyanè Sniqè
 Madrashta D-Nsiwin

See also 
 Paulus Khofri
 William D. S. Daniel

References 

 Assyrian Aid Society of America, Mesopotaminan Night
 Bethsuryoyo(website)

Syriac-language singers
Iranian composers
1942 births
Iranian Assyrian people
Singers from Tehran
20th-century Iranian male singers
20th-century composers
Assyrian musicians
People from Urmia
Assyrian Iranian writers
Assyrian writers
Living people
Iranian people of Assyrian descent